Reece Avery Beekman (born October 8, 2001) is an American college basketball player for the Virginia Cavaliers of the Atlantic Coast Conference (ACC).

Early life
Beekman was born in Milwaukee, Wisconsin. He moved to Baton Rouge, Louisiana with his brother and mother when he was 13 years old. He went to Scotlandville High School and played basketball throughout his four years at the school.

High school career
Beekman was a four-year letter-winner from 2017–20 under head coach Carlos Sample at Scotlandville Magnet HS. He led the Hornets to a 131–14 record and four Louisiana High School Athletic Associate (LHSAA) 5A state championships. He also earned Louisiana Mr. Basketball honors after averaging 19.4 points, 9.1 rebounds, 9.9 assists, 2.7 blocked shots and 2.2 steals as a senior in 2019–20.

Recruiting
As a four-star recruit, Reece Beekman started getting offers in the Spring of 2018, but it wasn't until late July 2018 when he got his Virginia offer. During this recruitment process, Beekman received 21 offers including Florida, LSU, Wisconsin, and USC. Beekman would go on his official visit to UVA in November 2018 but wanted to wait a few months before he committed. On June 13, 2019, Reece Beekman had a surprise commitment to Virginia. It was not till December 10, 2019, that he signed his Letter of Intent to play at UVA.

College career
On August 1, 2020, Beekman enrolled at UVA. He took over as one of the starting guards early into the season due to his impressive performances. During the ACC tournament, Beekman hit a game-winning buzzer-beater, to beat Syracuse and advance to the semifinals of the ACC Tournament. Through his first season, Beekman has averaged 4.7 points, 2.8 rebounds, and 3.0 assists while shooting 38.2% from the field. As a sophomore, he was named to the ACC All-Defensive Team as well as Honorable Mention All-ACC.

Career statistics

College

|-
| style="text-align:left;"| 2020–21
| style="text-align:left;"| Virginia
| 25 || 20 || 29.4 || .382 || .243 || .758 || 2.8 || 3.0 || 1.2 || .4 || 4.7 
|-
| style="text-align:left;"| 2021–22
| style="text-align:left;"| Virginia
| 35 || 35 || 35.1 || .449 || .338 || .761 || 3.9 || 5.2 || 2.1 || .7 || 8.2
|-
| style="text-align:left;"| 2022–23
| style="text-align:left;"| Virginia
| 32 || 32 || 32.6 || .405 || .351 || .793 || 3.0 || 5.3 || 1.8 || .5 || 9.5
|- class="sortbottom"
| style="text-align:center;" colspan="2"| Career
| 92 || 87 || 32.7 || .419 || .324 || .777 || 3.3 || 4.6 || 1.7 || .6 || 7.7

References

External links
Virginia Cavaliers bio

2001 births
Living people
American men's basketball players
Basketball players from Milwaukee
Point guards
Virginia Cavaliers men's basketball players